Aldair Quintana (born 11 July 1994) is a professional association footballer from Colombia. He plays as a goalkeeper for Atlético Nacional in the Colombian Categoría Primera A.

Quintana was in the youth system at River Plate before moving to Medellin.

International career
Quintana was named in the provisional  Colombia squad for the 2019 Copa América.

References

1994 births
Living people
Colombian footballers
Association football goalkeepers
Categoría Primera A players
Atlético Nacional footballers
Atlético Huila footballers
Deportes Tolima footballers
Independiente Medellín footballers
Orsomarso S.C. footballers
Atlético F.C. footballers
2021 Copa América players
People from Ibagué